Tu-Plang (ตู้เพลง Thai for Jukebox) (1996) was the first album released by Australian rock band Regurgitator after making two EPs. The band chose to record the album in Bangkok, Thailand, to the quandary of its label, Warner Music, which was uncertain as to what terms A&R executive Michael Parisi had contracted. Ely later said, "We didn't want to do it in just any old place, so we had a tour in Europe and Japan booked and our drummer Martin said, 'let's stop in Thailand on the way and check out some studios,' so we did and we found this place."

Producer Magoo later said the studio, "was [owned by] this guy [who was in the band] Carabao. He was described to us as the local, Thai, Bruce Springsteen. He had this compound in outer Bangkok. We'd drive there and it's in the middle of all these slums. There were wild chickens running around everywhere. There were open sewers and stuff like that."

At the ARIA Music Awards of 1996, the album won two awards; Best Alternative Album and Breakthrough album.

In 2012, Regurgitator performed the entire album along with Unit on the Australian RetroTech tour.

Reception

The Sydney Morning Herald described the album as, "an album that leapt from rock to rap, from fun to funk, from thrash to surf rock (a la Dick Dale), and it did nothing less than announce the arrival of the most significant band in Australia today. More successfully than any of their peers, Regurgitator showed they were committed to pushing the boundaries of contemporary music through their marriage of technology and pop." The Age said the album "at times resembles a net surfer's wet dream, skipping from one style to another, sometimes mid-song," and noted Yeomans' sardonic lyrics. They later voted Tu-Plang as one of the greatest albums from the first 50 years of Australian music.

Less flatteringly, AllMusic said the album was, "an utterly misbegotten funk-rap-metal fusion which, much as the band's name implies, offers merely another rehash of the usual genre fare." The song "Pop Porn" was singled out for being, "so overboard in attacking rap misogyny that it reaches levels of offensiveness beyond anything actually in the true hip-hop canon."

Track listing
 "I Sucked a Lot of Cock to Get Where I Am" (Q. Yeomans)
 "Kong Foo Sing" (Q. Yeomans)
 "G7 Dick Electro Boogie" (Q. Yeomans)
 "Couldn't Do It" (Happy Shopper Mix)" (B. Ely)
 "Miffy's Simplicity" (Q. Yeomans)
 "Social Disaster" (Q. Yeomans)
 "Music is Sport" (Q. Yeomans)
 "348 Hz" (B. Ely)
 "Mañana" (B. Ely)
 "F.S.O." (Q. Yeomans)
 "Pop Porn" (Q. Yeomans)
 "Young Bodies Heal Quickly" (Q. Yeomans)
 "Blubber Boy" (Riding the Wave of Fashion Mix) (Q. Yeomans)
 "Doorselfin" (B. Ely)

Charts

Weekly charts

Year-end charts

Certifications

Track information
 "G7 Dick Electro Boogie" contains samples of street sounds in Bangkok. Yeomans later said, "I think this song[']s small claim to fame is attributed to the 'gang-rape a cripple' line nicely taken out of context by a few bored conservative factions floating around at the time."
 Track 4 is a Muzak version of "Couldn't Do It" off the band's first self-titled EP.
 "Blubber Boy" is an up-tempo version of "Blubber Boy" off the band's second EP, New.

Release history

References

ARIA Award-winning albums
Regurgitator albums
1996 debut albums
East West Records albums
Reprise Records albums